Fortuné Willis Oré (born 26 October 1997) is a Beninese professional footballer who plays as a defender for Vannes B. In 2014, he made six appearances for the Benin national team.

References

1997 births
Living people
Association football defenders
Beninese footballers
Benin international footballers
AS Oussou Saka players
USS Kraké players
AS Police (Benin) players
US Raon-l'Étape players
Vannes OC players
Beninese expatriate footballers
Expatriate footballers in France
Beninese expatriate sportspeople in France